New Delhi: Making of a Capital is an illustrated book about the construction of the Indian capital New Delhi, written by Malvika Singh and Rudrangshu Mukherjee, edited by Pramod Kapoor and published by Roli Books in 2009. The book contains several previously unpublished images and newspaper cuttings, which show the wide coverage given in England on the extent of the project on building New Delhi.

References

2009 non-fiction books
History books about India
New Delhi
Roli Books books